Sands of Destruction, known in Japan as , is an anime television series adapted from the video game of the same title developed and published by Sega. Produced by Production I.G and directed by Shunsuke Tada, it was broadcast on TV Tokyo from July 7 to September 29, 2008.

It features an opening theme titled "ZERØ" and sung by AAA, and an ending theme titled  sung by Aimmy. The series features only a single season of 13 episodes. It was licensed by Funimation Entertainment for a North American release, and the DVD set was released in 2010.

Development
Sega announced the anime along the game's initial reveal in April 2008.

Episode list

References

External links 
 Anime official website  (archive)
 Anime website  at TV Tokyo 
 

Anime television series based on video games
Apocalyptic anime and manga
Fantasy anime and manga